The Action Party for the Independence of Kurdistan is a political party in Kurdistan Region. It is part of the Kurdistan Regional Government.

The party split from the Iraqi Communist Party and became affiliated with the Patriotic Union of Kurdistan. Its founder, Mohammed Hussein Halleq, was murdered in 1995. His successor, Yousif Hanna Yousif, or Abu Hikmat, joined the Kurdistan Democratic Party of Iraq-led government as a minister.

References

External links
psk2006.org Official site

Communism in Kurdistan
Iraqi Communist Party breakaway groups
Kurdish nationalist political parties
Kurdish political parties in Iraq
Kurdish nationalism in Iraq
Kurdish separatism in Iraq
Kurdistan independence movement
Political parties in Kurdistan Region
Pro-independence parties
Separatism in Iraq
Secessionist organizations in Asia